The Chambersburg Formation is a geologic formation in Virginia. It preserves fossils dating back to the Ordovician period.

See also

 List of fossiliferous stratigraphic units in Virginia
 Paleontology in Virginia

References
 

Ordovician geology of Virginia
Ordovician southern paleotemperate deposits